Steaming is a method of cooking using steam. This is often done with a food steamer, a kitchen appliance made specifically to cook food with steam, but food can also be steamed in a wok. In the American southwest, steam pits used for cooking have been found dating back about 5,000 years. Steaming is considered a healthy cooking technique that can be used for many kinds of foods.

Because steaming can be achieved by heating less water or liquid, and because of the excellent thermodynamic heat transfer properties of steam, steaming can be as fast, or faster, than cooking in boiling water, as well as being more energy efficient.

History
Some of the world's earliest examples of steam cooking were found in China's Yellow River Valley; early steam cookers made of stoneware have been found dating back as far as 5,000 BCE. And also in Gunma Prefecture, Japan, created during the Stone Age. Some of the second earliest examples of steam cooking have been found in Italy and Sardinia, created during the Bronze Age, and in Cochise County, Arizona, where steam pits were used for cooking about 10,000 years ago.   From the eighth century CE, thin cypress strips were used to make steamers; today their slatted bases are constructed from bamboo.
The classic steamer has a chimney in the center, which distributes the steam among the tiers.

While steaming has not caught up in the west for assorted dishes, the technique was heavily popularized worldwide by Chinese and East Asian cuisine. The two main classic steamers feature the ancient bamboo steamer as well as the modern metal (aluminum or stainless steel) steamer, with the difference being that the bamboo lid takes longer to heat up but absorbs excess moisture and allows heat to condense again over the delicate food. Other developments were the creations of microwaveable silicone steamers and plastic-hybrid steamers.

Method

Steaming works by boiling water continuously, causing it to vaporize into steam; the steam then carries heat to the nearby food, thus cooking the food. The food is kept separate from the boiling water but has direct contact with the steam, resulting in a moist texture to the food. This differs from double boiling, in which food is not directly exposed to steam, or pressure cooking, which uses a sealed vessel, but which is capable of pressure steaming or submerging.

Such cooking is most often done by placing the food into a food steamer, typically a circular container made of metal or wood and bamboo. The steamer usually has a lid that is placed on the top of the container during cooking to allow the steam to cook through the food. When a steamer is unavailable, food can be steamed inside a wok, supported over boiling water in the bottom of the wok by a metal frame. Some modern home microwave ovens include a structure to cook food by steam vapor produced in a separate water container, providing a similar result to being cooked on stove. There are also specialized steam ovens available.

Steamed foods

In Japan, glutinous rice is steamed to prepare mochi rice cakes. Traditional Japanese sweets or wagashi making involves steaming rice or wheat dough for making mochigashi and manju.

In Western cooking, steaming is most often used to cook vegetablesit is rarely used to cook meats. However, steamed clams are prepared by steaming. With Chinese cuisine, vegetables are usually stir fried or blanched and seldom steamed. Seafood and meat dishes are steamed. For example: steamed whole fish, steamed crab, steamed pork spare ribs, steamed ground pork or beef, steamed chicken and steamed goose.

Rice can be steamed too, although in Chinese cooking this is simply referred to as "cooking" rather than "steaming". In Thailand steaming is the definition of minimalist cooking. Wheat foods are steamed as well. Examples include buns and Chinese steamed cakes. Similarly, in Mexican and Central American cuisine, tamales are made by steaming a dough made from nixtamalized maize (called masa) in wrappers made from corn husks or banana leaves; the dough can be stuffed or left plain.

Steamed meat dishes (except fish and some dim sum) are less common in Chinese restaurants than in traditional home cooking, because meats usually require longer cooking times to steam than to stir fry. Commercially sold frozen foods (such as dim sum) formerly had instructions to reheat by steaming, until the rise in popularity of home microwave ovens, which have considerably shorter cooking times.

Chinese dishes
Staple foods
Mantou, steamed bread
Wotou, Chinese cornbread
Chinese steamed eggs similar to custard with local variety of ingredients and vessels.

Dim sum (Shaomai, Baozi, dumpling)

Rice
Steamed rice with crab, Fujian cuisine called 蠘飯 (蟳飯).
Steamed Pork with rice: pork steamed with crushed rice called 粉蒸肉.

Seafood
Fish: Chinese perch, grouper, Japanese black porgy.
Crab: Chinese mitten crab, Shanghai cuisine for the autumn.

Soup
Steamed Pork Rib Soup: a Jiangxi cuisine called :zh:煨汤.
Buddha Jumps Over the Wall: a Fujian cuisine.
Winter Melon Soup: use a hollowed out and sculpted gourd as a vessel.
Qi Guoji Steamed Chicken Soup: soup of chicken cooked with double steamer, a Yunnan cuisine called :zh:汽锅鸡.

Sweets
Milk Pudding: called Daliang Milk Pudding (大良双皮奶) as said to be made in the 1850s in Daliang in Foshan, Guangdong.
Guilinggao: also known as Turtle Jelly, a jelly-like Chinese medicine, also sold as a dessert.

Japanese dishes
Bread

Chawanmushi (Savory egg custard): beaten egg, dashi soup and ingredients (chicken, shrimp, ginkgo nuts, kamaboko and mitsuba) into a bowl with a lid.
Odamaki-mushi: udon in a cup of chawan-mushi. Osaka specialty.

Glutinous rice. Instead of boiling, glutinous rice is steamed to eat. *Okowa  as it is called, receipts with ingredients and vessel chestnuts (kuri okowa) or wild herbs (sansai okowa) are popular. 
: served at festive occasions with azuki bean and color agent added to enhance red color.
Mochi: prepared with steamed rice and kneaded.

There are recipes where sauce is added to the main ingredients, aiming to control smell or aroma, or keep moisture to the ingredients.
Awayukimushi: egg meringue over fish or seafood and keep moisture as well as retain aroma.
Kaburamushi: grated or shredded turnip covers crabs and fish to keep moisture.
Sakamushi: add sake to steam sea bream and clams which will reduce fishy smell.

Recipes named after the container.
Dobin-mushi: matsutake and fish in a pot together with dashi soup.
Yugama: yuzu citrus is hollowed out into a cup to hold and add zest to the food.
Sea bream milt steamed in yugama
Sweets: steaming is an important process in Japanese sweets making such as manjū, yōkan, uirō, karukan or suama.

Korean dishes
 Gyeran-jjim, a custardy dish

Benefits
Overcooking or burning food is easily avoided when steaming it. Individuals preferring to avoid additional fat intake may prefer steaming to methods which require cooking oil.

A 2007 USDA comparison between steaming and boiling vegetables shows the most affected nutrients are folic acid and vitamin C. When compared to raw consumption, steaming reduces folic acid by 15%, and boiling reduces it by 35%. Steaming reduces vitamin C by 15%, and boiling reduces it by 25%.

Steaming, compared to boiling, showed 42% higher amount of glucosinolates in broccoli cooked for medium firmness. Phenolic compounds with antioxidant properties have been found to retain significantly better through steaming than through boiling or microwaving. Steaming compared to boiling retained β-carotene in carrots. The effect of cooking food may increase or decrease the nutrients.

See also

Double steaming
List of steamed foods
Bamboo steamer, an East Asian steamer made from bamboo
Siru, a Korean earthenware steamer

References

External links

Cooking techniques
Culinary terminology